Irina Podyalovskaya (born 9 October 1959) is a retired female middle distance runner who represented the USSR in the 1970s and the early 1980s. She set her personal best in the women's 800 metres (1:55.69) on 22 June 1984 at a meet in Kiev.

She holds the current world record in the rarely contested 4 × 800 metres relay (7:50.17 minutes with Nadezhda Olizarenko, Lyubov Gurina and Lyudmila Borisova).

References

Profile

1959 births
Living people
Sportspeople from Mogilev Region
Soviet female middle-distance runners
Belarusian female middle-distance runners
World Athletics record holders (relay)
Universiade medalists in athletics (track and field)
Universiade gold medalists for the Soviet Union
Honoured Masters of Sport of the USSR
Medalists at the 1983 Summer Universiade
Friendship Games medalists in athletics